is a passenger railway station located in the city of Naruto, Tokushima Prefecture, Japan. It is operated by JR Shikoku and has the station number "N09".

Lines
Only local services stop at the station.

Layout
The station, which is unstaffed, consists of a side platform serving a single track. A simple station building serves as a waiting room. The platform is at the same level as the access road and may be entered without the need for a ramp or steps.

History
On 18 January 1928, the line was extended to a new terminus further northeast. The new terminus (the present  took over the name Muya and this station was renamed . After the Awa Railway was nationalized on 1 July 1933, Japanese Government Railways (JGR) took over control of the station. The kanji name was changed to 蛭子前駅 which still read as Ebisumae-eki. JGR operated the station as part of the Awa Line until 20 March 1935 when some other stations on the line were absorbed into the Kōtoku Main Line. Ebisumae then became part of the Muya Line. On 1 August 1948, the terminus at Muya was renamed Naruto and Ebisumae regained the name Muya. On 1 March 1956, the line which served the station was renamed the Naruto Line. On 1 April 1987, with the privatization of Japanese National Railways (JNR), the successor of JGR, the station came under the control of JR Shikoku.

Passenger statistics
In fiscal 2019, the station was used by an average of 492 passengers daily

Surrounding area
 Kotoshironushi Shrine
 Tokushima Prefectural Naruto Uzushio High School Naruto Campus (former Tokushima Prefectural Naruto Daiichi High School)
 Naruto City Daiichi Junior High School

See also
 List of Railway Stations in Japan

References

External links

 JR Shikoku timetable

Railway stations in Tokushima Prefecture
Railway stations in Japan opened in 1916
Naruto, Tokushima